These are the Thailand national futsal team results, including FIFA Approved and unofficial friendly matches. Only FIFA Approval will be used in calculation of Futsal World Ranking.

2010
Friendly Match

2010 Thailand Five's (Friendly Tournament)

Friendly Match

2010 AFC Futsal Championship

Friendly Match

2011
Friendly Match

2011 Southeast Asian Games

2012
Friendly Match

2012 AFC Futsal Championship qualification : ASEAN

Friendly Match

2012 AFF Futsal Championship

Friendly Match

2012 AFC Futsal Championship

Friendly Match

2012 FIFA Futsal World Cup

2013

Friendly Match

2013 Asian Indoor and Martial Arts Games

Friendly Match

 Pre-Southeast Asian Games (Friendly Tournament)

2013 AFF Futsal Championship

Friendly Match

2013 Ho Chi Minh City International Futsal (Friendly Tournament)

2013 Southeast Asian Games

2014
Friendly Match

2014 AFC Futsal Championship

Friendly Match

2014 AFF Futsal Championship

2014 CFA International (Friendly Tournament)

2015
Friendly Match

2015 AFF Futsal Championship

2016
Friendly Match

2016 AFC Futsal Championship

Charity Match (for Benarong Panpop, captain of Kasem Bundit U. FC) 

Friendly Match 

2016 Thailand Five's (Friendly Tournament) 

Friendly Match 

2016 FIFA Futsal World Cup

Friendly Match 

2016 AFF Futsal Championship

2017
Friendly Match

2016 AFF Futsal Championship

Friendly Match

2017 Southeast Asian Games

2017 Thailand Five's

2017 Asian Indoor and Martial Arts Games

2017 AFF Futsal Championship

2018
Friendly Match

2018 AFC Futsal Championship

2018 Thailand Five's

2018 AFF Futsal Championship

2019

2020

2021

2022

National